Nguyễn Văn Khoi (born 1935) is a former Vietnamese cyclist. He competed in the individual road race and team time trial events at the 1964 Summer Olympics.

References

External links
 

1935 births
Living people
Vietnamese male cyclists
Olympic cyclists of Vietnam
Cyclists at the 1964 Summer Olympics
Place of birth missing (living people)